"Because of Love" is a song by American singer Janet Jackson from her fifth album, Janet (1993). It was released as the album's fourth single in January 1994, the track is a love song written and produced by Jackson and Jimmy Jam and Terry Lewis. A remix of the song, the Frankie & David Treat Mix, appears on Jackson's second remix compilation Janet Remixed (1995).

Critical reception
Larry Flick from Billboard wrote, "Jackson is at her most playful on this adorable pop/funk ditty. Though it does not have the lyrical depth or musical range of past hits, tune has an instantly memorable hook and several fun sing-along passages that renders it simply irresistable." Alan Jones from Music Week rated the song four out of five, adding, "not a number one, but bound for the upper reaches." Tom Doyle from Smash Hits gave it two out of five, saying, "Janet keeps the Jackson flag a-flying with another track from her Janet LP. In it she goes "Shoop-shoop-a-doo-doop" over a repetitive house beat, then wafts the merest hint of a melody over it, then it all stops."

Chart performance
"Because of Love" became Jackson's first solo single since 1987's "The Pleasure Principle" to miss the top five domestically, peaking at number ten on the U.S. Billboard Hot 100 and number six on the U.S. Billboard Hot 100 Airplay. It was a moderate success in other countries reaching the top twenty in the U.K. and top thirty in Australia.

Music video
The video, directed by Beth McCarthy, is composed of footage of Jackson and her dancers on the promo TV Shows tour (London; Leipzig, Saxony; New York City; Paris and Sydney) and rehearsals of Janet World Tour in Hartford, Connecticut. It was later included on the repackaged edition of 2001's All for You as well as the 2004 DVD From Janet to Damita Jo: The Videos.
The close up footage of Janet Jackson was filmed at The Four Seasons Hotel, Boston. Her dog received a room amenity of a personalized, homemade milk bone treat.

Live performances
Jackson performed the song on her janet. Tour and was the dedication song for the country of Taiwan for her 2011 Number Ones, Up Close and Personal tour. The song was also used in the DJ Intermission session on the 2017-2019 State of the World Tour.

Track listing and formats

 US 12-inch single (Y-38422) Frankie & David classic 12-inch – 7:49
 Frankie & David dub – 8:02
 Frankie & David Trick mix – 6:42
 Frankie & David Treat mix – 6:40
 D&D extended mix – 5:10

 US CD maxi single  (V25H-38422)
 LP version – 4:12
 Frankie & David classic 12-inch – 7:48
 D&D extended mix – 5:08
 Muggs 7-inch with bass intro – 3:32
 Frankie & David dub – 8:02
 D&D slow version – 4:30

 Dutch CD maxi single (VSCDF 1488)
 LP version – 4:14
 Frankie & David Classic 12" – 7:49
 D&D Extended Mix – 5:10

 UK 7-inch single (VS1488) LP version – 4:14
 Frankie & David 7-inch – 3:33

 UK 12-inch single (VST 1488)
 Frankie & David classic 12-inch – 7:49
 Frankie & David dub – 8:02
 Frankie & David Trick mix – 6:42
 Frankie & David Treat mix – 6:40
 D&D extended mix – 5:10
 Muggs 7-inch with bass intro – 3:32

 UK CD maxi single (VSCDG 1488)'''
 LP version – 4:14
 Frankie & David 7-inch – 3:33
 Frankie & David classic 12-inch – 7:49
 Frankie & David Treat mix – 6:40
 D&D Bentley radio mix – 3:59
 Muggs 7-inch with bass intro – 3:32
 D&D slow version – 5:08

Charts

Weekly charts

Year-end charts

Release history

References

1993 songs
1994 singles
American funk songs
Janet Jackson songs
Song recordings produced by Jimmy Jam and Terry Lewis
Songs written by Janet Jackson
Songs written by Jimmy Jam and Terry Lewis